Kristiina Marketta "Tintti" Wegelius (born 12 October 1960) is a Finnish former competitive figure skater. She won medals at Skate Canada International, Skate America, and NHK Trophy, as well as four Finnish national titles. Wegelius placed tenth at the 1980 Winter Olympics, as high as sixth at the World Championships (1981, 1983), and as high as fourth at the European Championships (1979, 1980, 1981). She was coached by Carlo Fassi.

After retiring from competition, Wegelius performed with Disney on Ice and became a skating coach and choreographer. As of January 2009, she was living with her husband and daughter, Khayla (born  1998), in Quebec City, Canada.

Results

References

External links
skatabase

1960 births
Living people
Figure skaters at the 1980 Winter Olympics
Finnish female single skaters
Olympic figure skaters of Finland
Sportspeople from Helsinki
Finnish emigrants to Canada
20th-century Finnish women